Wilsoniella may refer to:
 Wilsoniella (brachiopod) Khalfin, 1939, a fossil genus of brachiopods in the family Trigonirhynchiidae
Wilsoniella Eichler, 1940, an unaccepted genus of lice in the family Philopteridae; synonym of Pessoaiella
Wilsoniella Pettibone, 1993, an unaccepted genus of annelids in the family Polynoidae; synonym of Pettibonesia
 Wilsoniella (plant), a genus of mosses in the family Ditrichaceae